Hellfire may refer to:

Metaphysical concepts
Fires of Hell
The lake of fire

Books
 Hell-Fire (story), a 1956 science fiction short story by American writer Isaac Asimov
 Hellfire (book), a 2005 history book written by Cameron Forbes
 Hellfire (comics), various characters
 Hellfire, a power of the Ghost Rider comic book character

Film and TV
 Hellfire (1949 film), a 1949 western
 Hellfire (1995 film), a TV movie produced by Roger Corman
 Hellfire: A Journey from Hiroshima, a 1986 documentary film
 Hell Fire (2012 film), a 2012 horror film
 HellFire, a 1985 episode from the first season of MacGyver

Gaming
 Diablo: Hellfire, a 1997 expansion pack to the computer game Diablo from Sierra On-Line
 Hellfire (video game), a 1989 arcade game, later ported to the Mega Drive and PC Engine CD-ROM

Music
 Davey "Hellfire" Kelly, one-time guitarist of the Sonic Boom Six
 Hellfire (1349 album), 2005 album by Norwegian black metal group 1349
 Hellfire (Black Midi album), 2022 album by English rock band Black Midi

Songs
 "Hellfire" (song), song from the 1996 animated film The Hunchback of Notre Dame
 "Hellfire" (Mango Groove song), 1989 single by Mango Groove
 "Hellfire", a song from the final stage of the video game Soulcalibur II (2002), and from the Soulcalibur II Original Soundtrack (2003)
 "Hellfire", a song from Airbourne's 2008 album Runnin' Wild
 "Hellfire", a song from Gamma ray's 2005 album Majestic
 "Hellfire", 2017 song by Barns Courtney

Military
 AGM-114 Hellfire, an air-to-surface and surface-to-surface missile system
 Hell-Fire trigger, a device designed to increase the rate of fire of a semi-auto firearm

See also
 Hellfire preaching
 Hellfire Club (disambiguation)
 Hellfire Pass (disambiguation)
 Lake of Fire (disambiguation)